Gallowaya is a genus of rust fungi in the family Coleosporiaceae. The genus contains two species that grow on pines species in North America and Siberia.

References

External links

Pucciniales